Francisco Javier Insa Bohigues (born 25 January 1988) or better known as Kiko Insa is a former professional footballer who last played for Johor Darul Ta'zim. Previously, Insa plays mainly as a centre-back but can also play as a defensive midfielder or as a central midfielder. Currently, he works as a football agent with his own company, Insa Project Global Group.

Club career

Early career 
Insa is a football journeyman. He had played in Spanish Third Division with CD Alcoyano in 2007-2008 and also in the Belgium league with UR Namur.

Bali United (loan) 
On 29 February 2016, Insa signed with Indonesian club Bali United on loan deal from Arema. Insa made his debut for Bali United in a match against Pusamania Borneo.

Pahang 
In January 2017, Kiko Insa signed a one-year contract with Malaysia Super League club Pahang as a Malaysian naturalisation. That means he is eligible to play in Malaysia Football League under Malaysian quota. On 21 January 2017, Insa made his league debut for Pahang in 1–1 draw against Perak at Perak Stadium.

Bangkok Glass 
On 2 February 2018, Insa signed a one-year contract with Thai League 1 club Bangkok Glass. Insa made his Thai League 1 debut in a 0–0 draw against Navy on 24 February 2018.

Johor Darul Ta'zim 
He ended his stint with Bangkok Glass and joined Johor Darul Ta'zim in May 2018.

International career 
Kiko Insa was called up by Malaysia manager Nelo Vingada to the training camp from 14 August 2017 until 5 September 2017. He made his first appearance for 60 minutes during Malaysia's 1–2 friendly loss against Syria.

Personal life 
Kiko Insa was born in Alicante, Spain. Kiko Insa is eligible to play for the Malaysia national team after he obtained Malaysian citizenship through his grandmother who was born in Sabah.  He can speak both Malay and Indonesian fluently from his stints at Arema and Bali United. His brother, Natxo, is also a professional footballer who is currently his teammate in Johor Darul Ta'zim.

Career statistics

Club

International

Honours

Club
Johor Darul Ta'zim
 Malaysia Super League : 2018, 2019
 Malaysia Charity Shield : 2019, 2020

Johor Darul Ta'zim II
 Malaysia Challenge Cup : 2019

References

External links 
 
 
 Kiko Insa at Eurosports

1988 births
Living people
Association football defenders
Footballers from Alicante
Spanish people of Malaysian descent
Citizens of Malaysia through descent
Malaysian people of Spanish descent
Spanish footballers
Malaysian footballers
Malaysian expatriate footballers
Atlético Albacete players
Spanish expatriates in Malaysia
Sri Pahang FC players
Arema F.C. players
Bali United F.C. players
Oxford City F.C. players
Ungmennafélagið Víkingur players
FK Ventspils players
Caravaca CF players
Malaysia international footballers